Empire is an unincorporated community and census-designated place in Dodge and Bleckley counties in the U.S. state of Georgia. As of the 2020 census, the CDP had a population of 319.

History
The Georgia General Assembly incorporated the place in 1911 as the "Town of Empire". Founders of the community named it "Empire" in order to promote a sawmill established there. The town's municipal charter was repealed in 1995.

Geography
Empire is located primarily in Dodge County but extends west into Bleckley County as well. U.S. Route 23 passes through the CDP, leading north  to Cochran, the Bleckley County seat, and south  to Eastman, the Dodge County seat.

Demographics

References

Former municipalities in Georgia (U.S. state)
Census-designated places in Georgia (U.S. state)
Census-designated places in Bleckley County, Georgia
Census-designated places in Dodge County, Georgia
Populated places disestablished in 1995